The Battle of Køge was a battle on 29 August 1807 between British troops besieging Copenhagen and Danish militia raised on Sjælland. It ended in British victory and is also known as 'Træskoslaget' or 'the Clogs Battle', since many of the Danish militiamen threw their heavy wooden clogs away when they were fleeing.

Background
The British government feared the Danish fleet was about to fall into French hands and thus delivered Denmark–Norway an ultimatum to sail its fleet to Britain or face war with Britain. The Danish government refused so British troops landed at Vedbæk on 16 August and began an investment on Copenhagen. Joachim Castenschiold was ordered to create a frikorps and lift the investment. Castenschiold's forces concentrated themselves around Roskilde and Lejre, while general Oxholm was sent south to activate the Søndre Sjællandske Landeværnsregiment. Castenschiold arrived at Køge on 26 August and two days later he was joined by Oxholm and his force. This gave Castenschiold a grand total of around 7,000 militiamen, 600 cavalry and 13 cannon. In the meantime the British headquarters at Copenhagen had become aware of the Danish militia's mobilisation and on 27 August general Arthur Wellesley (later 1st Duke of Wellington) was ordered to locate and defeat it.

Battle
Wellesley's 6,000-man Anglo-German infantry force included the 1st Battalion of the 43rd Foot, the 2nd Battalion of the 52nd Foot, the 1st Battalion of the 92nd Foot, five companies from the 1st and 2nd Battalions of the 95th Foot, and the 6th Line Battalion King's German Legion. Three squadrons each of the 1st, 2nd and 3rd King's German Legion Hussar Regiments totaled 1,620 cavalrymen. The eight 6-pound cannons and two 5.5-inch howitzers were served by Newhouse's battery of the Royal Horse Artillery and Sympher's half-battery of the King's German Legion. Colonel Wilhelm von Linsingen was Wellesley's brigade commander. 

Castenschiold's force was made up of 7,000 infantry in 11 battalions, 150 cavalry in two squadrons, and 120 artillerists serving nine guns. The foot soldiers were organized into the 5th, 6th and 7th Battalions of the North Zealand Landværn, the 1st, 2nd, 4th, 5th, 7th, 8th, 9th and 10th Battalions of the South Zealand Landværn. There were 70 horsemen from the Zealand Cavalry Regiment and 80 mounted troops from the Landværn Cavalry.

Aftermath
In the period from 16 to 31 August, Anglo-German losses numbered 29 killed, 122 wounded, and 21 missing. The Danes lost two officers killed and four wounded, while their rank and file suffered 150 killed and 200 wounded. Their greatest loss was in prisoners. The Allies captured over 1,700 men, including Oxholm, nine majors, 19 captains, and 28 lieutenants. Anglo-German trophies included all nine artillery pieces, one color, and 68 wagons.

References

Battles involving Denmark
Battles involving the United Kingdom
Conflicts in 1807
Battles of the Napoleonic Wars
1807 in Denmark
Køge
August 1807 events